An enamel sign is a sign made using vitreous enamel.  These were commonly used for advertising and street signage in the period 1880 to 1950.  Benjamin Baugh created the first purpose-built factory for making such signs in Selly Oak in 1889 — the Patent Enamel Company. The technique of porcelain enamelling on cast iron was developed in Central Europe in the early 1800s.

See also

References

Signage